The 1895–96 Yale Bulldogs men's ice hockey season was the 1st season of play for the program.

Season

Yale can trace its ice hockey history back to 1893, however, it wasn't until 1986 that they played their first intercollegiate match. Malcolm Chace, who was also a nationally-ranked tennis player, founded the Yale men's team in his senior year, serving as both captain and manager of the club.

As there were no on-campus facilities capable of supporting an ice rink the team played all of their games on the road. Because there was no governing body overseeing the structure of the season, all games played by Yale are counted for their historical record.

Roster

Standings

Schedule and Results

|-
!colspan=12 style="color:white; background:#00356B" | Regular Season

References

Yale Bulldogs men's ice hockey seasons
Yale
Yale
Yale